Jagabandhu Patnaik (or Jagu Dewan) was the Dewan of Porahat in Singhbhum, village Kera (now in Jharkhand). He served as the Dewan under Raja Achyut Singh and his successor Raja Arjun Singh.

Together, they took part in anti-British activities during the 1857 Indian rebellion of Independence. The Kol rebellion of Singhbhum in 1831 was the outcome of the inspiration and instigation of Jagabandhu Patnaik more popularly known as Jagu Dewan to the Kols.

In the 1857 war he too encouraged Raja Arjun Singh to raise his arms against the British. Jagu Dewan with a strong force rose against the British and occupied Chakradharpur. But the British force under Lt. Birch reoccupied Chakradharpur. Jagu Dewan was captured and hanged.
Now Jagabandhu Patnaik's pedigree lives in "Kera Maa Mandir Sahi", also a statue was built in front of the Mandir and all National festivals are celebrated in the memory of the great freedom fighter Amar Jagabandhu Patnaik.

References

Indian people of the Indian Rebellion of 1857
History of Jharkhand
People from West Singhbhum district
Revolutionaries of the Indian Rebellion of 1857